Cascades Soccer club was a short lived soccer team which represented the workers of the Cascade Brewery in the Southern Premier league from 1931 until 1936. In the years before World War II it was common for companies to enter teams in local soccer competitions as a morale building exercise, and the Cascades Brewery did likewise. In their short life-span of 6 years, Cascade's team was incredibly successful, winning 4 Southern Premierships, as well as 4 state championships, and 4 cup wins.

Honours
State Championships: 4 times (1931,1932,1934,1935)
Southern Premierships: 4 times (1931,1932,1934,1935)
Falkinder Cup Winners: 2 times (1932, 1934)
Falkinder Cup Runners-up: Once (1933)
KO Cup Winners: 2 times (1934 (joint),1935)
KO Cup Runners-up: Once (1932)

References 

Defunct soccer clubs in Tasmania
Association football clubs established in 1931
1931 establishments in Australia
1936 disestablishments in Australia
Defunct soccer clubs in Australia
Works soccer clubs in Australia